Rosario Gómez Miranda (1930 – 22 February 2011), known as Chari Gómez Miranda, was a Spanish journalist and television presenter famous for her character "Doña Adelaida".

Biography
Chari Gómez Miranda's career began in radio. In 1978 she participated in the program A ciento veinte that was presented every Saturday morning by Eduardo Sotillos on Radio Nacional de España.

Her popularity came with television, in 1990, when she was signed by Jesús Hermida to make a brief summary and commentary about the Venezuelan telenovela Cristal which was broadcast daily on the show . Under the pseudonym of "Doña Adelaida", and with ease and self-confidence before the cameras, Gómez Miranda won the sympathies of the public, embodying a character who professed to make an endearing semblance of the archetype of maruja, or housewife.

After the end of Cristal and the Hermida program, "Doña Adelaida" continued presenting other telenovelas on Televisión Española.

Except for a brief interval in which Gómez Miranda presented the youth show Vaya fauna (1992) on Antena 3, her later career was closely linked to María Teresa Campos, with whom she worked on the Telecinco show  until its cancellation in 2004. She also made a venture into theater, and in 1998 took part in the play Dos mujeres a las nueve by Juan Ignacio Luca de Tena.

From 1996 to 1999 she appeared on the series  on Telecinco, playing the role of "Doña Úrsula", the kleptomaniac customer and gossip of the supermarket.

In 2001 she received the Andalucía Journalism Award for her television work.

Chari Gómez Miranda died in Madrid on 22 February 2011 after a long illness.

References

External links
 

1930 births
2011 deaths
20th-century Spanish actresses
Spanish journalists
Spanish radio presenters
Spanish women radio presenters
Spanish television presenters
Spanish women journalists
Spanish women television presenters